Daouda Diop (born 10 January 1993) is a Senegalese footballer who plays as a centre-back.

Club career

Inter Allies 
In January 2014, during the 2013–14 season, Diop joined Ghana Premier League club Inter Allies. On 13 May 2014, Diop helped Inter Allies beat Gomoa Fetteh in the semi-finals of the 2014 Ghanaian FA Cup. They eventually lost the final to Asante Kotoko 2–1 after extra time.

Diop helped Inter Allies finish sixth in the league, playing four games: two in the league and two in the cup. He was also awarded the "Most Dedicated Player" award by the club.

Ahed 
On 3 January 2018, Diop moved to Lebanese Premier League club Ahed on a six-month contract; he scored a goal in six matches.

International career 
Diop was called up by Senegal U23 for the 2015 African Games; he was an unused substitute throughout the tournament. Senegal eventually won the competition, beating Burkina Faso 1–0 in the final.

Honours 
Inter Allies
 Ghanaian FA Cup runner-up: 2014

Ahed
 Lebanese Premier League: 2016–17

Tadamon Sour
 Lebanese Challenge Cup runner-up: 2017

Individual
 Inter Allies Most Dedicated Player: 2013–14

References

External links 
 
 

1993 births
Living people
Senegalese footballers
Association football central defenders
Senegal Premier League players
Stade de Mbour players
Senegalese expatriate footballers
Expatriate footballers in Ghana
Senegalese expatriate sportspeople in Ghana
Ghana Premier League players
International Allies F.C. players
Expatriate footballers in Lebanon
Senegalese expatriate sportspeople in Lebanon
Lebanese Premier League players
Al Ahed FC players
Tadamon Sour SC players
Safa SC players